Centerville is an unincorporated community in Shasta County, California, United States.

History

The community was originally named Larkin after John Larkin, who owned a store and saloon in the community. A post office was located in the community from 1899 until 1912.

In 2018, the community was evacuated due to the Carr Fire, which destroyed homes in the community.

References

Unincorporated communities in California
Unincorporated communities in Shasta County, California